St. Michael Archangel's Church in Turzańsk (() - a Gothic, wooden church located in the village of Turzańsk from the nineteenth-century, which together with different tserkvas is designated as part of the UNESCO Wooden tserkvas of the Carpathian region in Poland and Ukraine.

History

The tserkva in Turzańsk, established as an Eastern Orthodox Church tsekva, later Uniate, was referenced in the first half of the sixteenth-century. The present tserkva was built at the start of the nineteenth-century in 1801, and later expanded in 1836, with a foyer and sacristy. In 1896 and 1913, the tserkva had undergone renovations of its roof, strengthening it with tin. After displacing the Ukrainian populous from the area, as part of Operation Vistula, the tserkva was used by Roman Catholics, between 1947 and 1961. In 1963, the tserkva was returned to the Polish Orthodox Church. The interior of the tserkva exhibits original components: iconostasis from 1895, and a polychrome from the turning point of the nineteenth and twentieth-century.

References

World Heritage Sites in Poland
Sanok County
Churches in Podkarpackie Voivodeship
1803 establishments in Poland
Churches completed in 1803
Polish Orthodox churches
19th-century churches in Poland
19th-century Eastern Orthodox church buildings